The 1999–2000 Serie A season was the 66th season of the Serie A, the top level of ice hockey in Italy. 15 teams participated in the league, and HC Bozen won the championship by defeating Asiago Hockey in the final.

First round

Second round

Group A

Group B

Group C

Playoffs

Qualification 
 HC Valpellice - HC Como 4:0

Bracket

External links
 Season on hockeyarchives.info

Serie A (ice hockey) seasons
Italy
1999–2000 in Italian ice hockey